The 1913–14 Danish National Football Tournament was the second Danish championship under the Danish Football Association.

Format
The format changed slightly from the last season, now only giving the winner of the provincial tournament a semi-final match against the second place finisher in the Copenhagen Championship.

Province tournament

First round

Second round

Third round

Copenhagen Championship

Semifinal

Final

External links
Denmark - List of final tables (RSSSF)
Landsfodboldturneringen 1913/14 at danskfodbold.com

1913–14 in Danish football
Top level Danish football league seasons
Denmark